"Slow Your Roll" is an expression to instruct someone to reduce the pace or enthusiasm for which they are doing something. It may refer to:

The motto of the soft drink Drank
"Slow Your Roll", a song from the Barry White album Staying Power (1999)
"Slow Your Roll", a song from the D12 album D12 World (2004)
"Slow Your Roll", a song from the self-titled album by Tunnel Rats (2004)
"Slow Your Roll", a song from Tha Dogg Pound album Cali Iz Active (2006)
"Slow Your Roll", a song from the self-titled album by Bleeding Through (2010)
"Slow Your Roll", a song from the Dizzee Rascal album Raskit (2017)
"Slow Your Roll", an episode from the fourth season of Inside Amy Schumer (2014)

See also
"Slow Your Role", a song from the Big Mello album Done Deal (2003)

English phrases
English-language slang